Edward Ross was a Scottish rugby union player.

He also played for London Scottish FC.

He was the brother of James Ross who was also capped for Scotland.

References
 Bath, Richard (ed.) The Scotland Rugby Miscellany (Vision Sports Publishing Ltd, 2007 )

Scottish rugby union players
Scotland international rugby union players
Year of birth missing
Year of death missing